The Flame in the Flood is a roguelike survival adventure video game developed by The Molasses Flood. The game was developed for Microsoft Windows, macOS, and Xbox One. A PlayStation 4 version was released on January 17, 2017. A Nintendo Switch version was released on October 12, 2017.

Gameplay
The player character is a young girl referred to as Scout. Her companion is a dog (named either Aesop or Daisy) who can sense danger and locate supplies. Scout uses a raft to traverse a large river, the result of an apocalyptic flood which has turned the land into a series of islands. The player must pay attention to Scout's needs such as her energy, thirst, hunger, and warmth, and not paying attention to them can result in death. Like other roguelikes, death is permanent, although the player can restart at predetermined checkpoints along the river if they are playing in Campaign mode. There is a crafting system allowing the player to create new items. Players will need to scavenge areas for valuable items. Factors such as the weather impact the gameplay. Players are able to create insulated clothing to protect them from the cold. One of the developers referred to it as a "travelling survival game".

Plot
The player must try to survive a river journey through the backwaters of a forgotten post-societal America.

Development
The game was developed by a team of people who previously worked on BioShock, Halo 2, and Rock Band. It had a successful crowdfunding campaign, reaching $251,647 of a $150,000 goal. Chuck Ragan, of the band Hot Water Music, composed the soundtrack. The game was originally available in beta, to its Kickstarter backers, and was released on Steam as an early access game on September 24, 2015.

Molasses Flood was later acquired by CD Projekt in October 2021.

Soundtrack

The soundtrack for the game was made by Chuck Ragan.

Reception

The Flame in the Flood received "mixed or average" reviews, on Metacritic, with the PC version scoring 73% based on 43 reviews, and the Xbox One version scoring 74% based on 22 reviews.

Ben Davis from Destructoid rated the game a 7.5/10 saying, "Even with its flaws, The Flame in the Flood remains an engaging and challenging survival game."

Mark Steighner of Hardcore Gamer gave the game a 4 out of 5 saying, "The Flame in the Flood offers a genuinely new variation on the survival game theme, tuned, focused and confident in its execution."

IGN awarded it a score of 7.3 out of 10, saying "Brutal and beautiful, The Flame in the Flood is a unique sort of survival game, with a few crucial flaws."

GameSpot awarded it a score of 8.0 out of 10, saying "Despite the awkward menu system, it's an absorbing game that lets you experience a journey in the present, and fully appreciate the sights, sounds, and joys of floating down the river in its alluring world."

References

External links
 Developer's website

2016 video games
Crowdfunded video games
Early access video games
Indie video games
Kickstarter-funded video games
MacOS games
PlayStation 4 games
Nintendo Switch games
Post-apocalyptic video games
Survival video games
Unreal Engine games
Video games featuring female protagonists
Windows games
Xbox One games
Video games about dogs
Video games developed in the United States
Video games set on fictional islands
Video games using procedural generation
Roguelike video games
Curve Games games
Single-player video games